Embassy of Ukraine in Hungary is the diplomatic mission of Ukraine in Budapest, Hungary.

History of the diplomatic relations
Hungary recognized the independence of Ukraine on December 6, 1991 and diplomatic relations between two countries were established same day by signing an agreement in Kyiv on the basics of good neighborliness and cooperation. The Embassy of Hungary was opened in Kyiv on December 6, 1991. On March 23, 1992 Embassy of Ukraine in Hungary began its functioning.

See also
 Hungary–Ukraine relations
 List of diplomatic missions in Hungary
 Foreign relations of Hungary
 Foreign relations of Ukraine

External Links

References

Hungary–Ukraine relations
Budapest
Ukraine
Buildings and structures in Budapest